Lee Zii Jia  (born 29 March 1998) is a Malaysian badminton player. He was the men's singles gold medalist at the 2019 Southeast Asian Games and won his first BWF Super 1000 title at the 2021 All England Open. Lee is the reigning men's singles Asian champion, winning the title at the 2022 Badminton Asia Championships.

Early life
Lee Zii Jia was born in Alor Setar, Kedah to Chinese Malaysians Lee Chee Hin and Leow Siet Peng, teachers and former basketball internationals. He was first introduced to badminton by his parents at the age of 6. In his earlier years, he studied at Keat Hwa H Primary School in Alor Setar, Kedah. Due to his results in the under 12 competition, he was soon drafted into the Bukit Jalil Sports School.

Career

2015 
In 2015, he became the junior champion in the Perak and Selangor Badminton Open. These standout performances and wins in the international circuit earned him a place in the Badminton Association of Malaysia.

2016 
In November 2016, Lee won a bronze medal in the World Junior Championships after losing to Chico Aura Dwi Wardoyo in the semifinals. In the same month, he advanced to the final of India International Series but was defeated by Lakshya Sen.

2017 
In February 2017, Lee reached the semifinals of the Thailand Masters, where he lost to Kantaphon Wangcharoen. In September 2017, he won his first senior title at the Polish International, against Soong Joo Ven in the final. In November 2017, Lee reached the semifinals of the Bitburger Open.

2018 
In October 2018, Lee reached the final of the Chinese Taipei Open by defeating the World No. 4 men's singles player, Chou Tien-chen in the semifinals. He defeated Riichi Takeshita in the final to win his first BWF World Tour title and second international title overall. In doing so, he became the second Malaysian other than Lee Chong Wei to win a BWF top flight men's singles title since 2013. Lee then reached the final of the Korea Masters but lost to Son Wan-ho.

2019 
Lee started the 2019 season by competing in the Thailand Masters. He lost in the quarter finals to Brice Leverdez of France in straight games. In the next tournaments, he also finished in the quarter finals in Malaysia Masters, Indonesia Masters, and German Open. He later lost in the early stage of Swiss, Malaysia, and Singapore Open's. He admitted that he had struggled to cope with financial difficulties, lack of progress and unfairness that affected his performance.

In August, Lee finally managed to make it into the semi-finals in the Thailand Open, where he lost to Chou Tien-chen of Taiwan. This was nonetheless an improvement to his being a quarter finalist in New Zealand and Indonesia Open's. He qualified to compete in World Championships in Basel, Switzerland, but lost to the World No. 1 men's singles player, and the eventual World Champion, Kento Momota of Japan in the quarter finals. In November, he was forced to retire in the second round of the China Open, and decided to withdraw as well from the next tournament in Hong Kong, due suffering from food poisoning and fever. Lee reached world No. 11 in the BWF World ranking on 12 November. In December, he won the men's singles gold medal at the Southeast Asian Games, and also helped the national men's team win the silver medal.

2020: Break Into Top 10 World Ranking  
Lee opened the season by participating in Southeast Asian tours in Malaysia, Indonesia, and Thailand Masters, with his best result being a semi-finalist in Malaysia, wherein he lost to the world number 1 Kento Momota in straight games. In February, he alongside Malaysia men's team, won the silver medal at the Asia Team Championships, during which time he was the national team captain He won 4 out of 5 matches in the Asia Team Championships, losing in the final match against Anthony Sinisuka Ginting.

Later in March, due to the outbreak of COVID-19 in Europe, the German Open was cancelled. Lee's next tournament was the All England Open, which was also be his debut at the tournament because his ranking was previously too low to qualify. He won against Jonatan Christie, who had won in four previous matches. He continued this win streak against Lu Guangzu and the then-Olympic champion Chen Long. In the semi-finals, he lost to Viktor Axelsen. The match lasted for 73 minutes. Further, Lee's performance at the All England Open raised his world ranking to no. 10 on 17 March 2020.

2021: All England Open title 
In March, Lee won his first Super 1000 tournament at the All England Open, defeating the defending champion Viktor Axelsen by a score of 30–29, 20–22, 21–9. In July 2021, in the 2020 Tokyo Summer Olympics, Lee took part in the men's singles and won against Artem Pochtarov with a score of 21–5 and 21–11. In the subsequent match against Brice Leverdez, he won with a score of 21–17 and 21–5. Lee was eliminated in the round of 16, where he was defeated by Chen Long with a score of 21–8, 19–21, and 5–21. On 7 November 2021, Lee reached the final of Hylo Open, however Lee had to retire due to the injuries he sustained while playing against Singapore's Loh Kean Yew with a score of 21–19, 13–21, 12–17.

2022: Leaving BAM and subsequent ban, Asian champion 
In January 2022, there were speculation that Lee had indicated his intention to leave the Badminton Association of Malaysia (BAM), citing unhappiness with the association, though reasons were never disclosed. He eventually officially resigned on 19 January. In response, Lee was banned for two years from participating in any international tournaments that required BAM's approval as well as any Badminton World Federation (BWF)–sanctioned tournaments. With the public and international players responding negatively on the ban, Lee appealed against the ban on 24 January 2022. The ban was lifted after Lee and BAM met on 25 January 2022, with the terms yet to be revealed.

In May, Lee won his first title of the year, the 2022 Badminton Asia Championships, defeating Indonesia's Jonatan Christie 21–17, 23–21 in straight sets. Lee became the sixth Malaysian men's singles player to win the Asian Championships title. On 22 May 2022, Lee won his first BWF World Tour Super 500 title at the 2022 Thailand Open, defeating China's Li Shifeng with a rubber set score of 17–21, 21–11, 23–21 in 70 minutes. 

In June, Lee participated in 3 events: the Indonesia Masters, the Indonesia Open and the Malaysia Open, his home event. At the Indonesia Masters, Lee, the 5th seed, lost to the 4th seeded Anthony Sinisuka Ginting in the quarter-finals in 3 games, 21–18, 15–21, 16–21. A week later, Lee lost to Viktor Axelsen, the World No 1 at the Indonesia Open semi-finals, with a score of 21–19, 11–21, 21–23 in 70 minutes. In late June, Lee took part in the Malaysia Open as the 5th seed. He surprisingly lost to Indonesia's Shesar Hiren Rhustavito in the Round of 16 in 3 games, 19–21, 21–19, 16–21 in an hour and six minutes.

Claiming injury, he decided to skip the Commonwealth Games and focus on the upcoming World Championships which would be held in August. As the fifth seed in World Championships, he lost to China's shuttler Zhao Junpeng in the third round in three games, with a match score of 19–21, 21–11, 19–21. The match lasted for an hour and five minutes. A week later, Lee lost to Srikanth Kidambi, the Former World No 1 at the first round of Japan Open, with a score of 20–22, 21-23 in 38 minutes.

On October 2022, Lee defeated former World Champion Loh Kean Yew of Singapore, with a score of 21-18, 21-15 in 40 minutes  and reached the Denmark Open final before losing to Shi Yuqi from China, with a score of 18-21, 21-16, 12-21 in 64 minutes. A few days later, Lee as 3rd seed in French Open, was surprised with another defeat at the first round, with a score of 18-21, 19-21 to the same opponent, Shesar Hiren Rhustavito from Indonesia that defeated him back in Malaysia Open earlier in June.

Australia Open was Lee's last hope of securing a final spot in the World Tour Finals. However, things did not go his way as one of his hands suffered a minor injury during the third game. He lost to Lu Guang Zu from China in 70 minutes with a scoreline of 22-20, 15-21, 16-21, thus ending Lee's hopes to enter the World Tour Finals as Lu claimed the final spot.

In November 2022, Lee decided to part ways with his coach Indra Wijaya, citing that he seeks to try 'something new' by foregoing a coach.

2023 
Lee opened the 2023 season on his home ground, the Malaysia Open, but was defeated in the first round by the Japanese new rising player Kodai Naraoka. The following week, he reached the second round of the India Open, but was defeated by Chinese player Li Shifeng. He competed in the Indonesia Masters but lost in the second round to Hong Kong player Ng Ka Long.

Lee was called up to captain the Malaysian squad for the 2023 Badminton Asia Mixed Team Championships. In the round robin stage, he won against Bharath Lateesh of the United Arab Emirates and lost against H.S. Prannoy of India. He won against Lei Lanxi of China in the knockout stage.

On 9 March, Lee was featured on digital billboard in Times Square, New York as part of badminton brand, Victor's 55th anniversary. Apart from Lee, other international badminton players such as Tai Tzu Ying, Anders Antonsen, Apriyani Rahayu, Siti Fadia Silva Ramadhanti, Hendra Setiawan and Mohammad Ahsan, were also on display. This makes Lee the first Malaysian badminton player to be featured on a Times Square billboard.

He competed in the German Open but lost in the second round to Chinese Taipei player Lee Chia-hao.

Achievements

Asian Championships 
Men's singles

Southeast Asian Games 
Men's singles

BWF World Junior Championships 
Boys' singles

BWF World Tour (3 titles, 3 runners-up) 
The BWF World Tour, which was announced on 19 March 2017 and implemented in 2018, is a series of elite badminton tournaments sanctioned by the Badminton World Federation (BWF). The BWF World Tour is divided into levels of World Tour Finals, Super 1000, Super 750, Super 500, Super 300, and the BWF Tour Super 100.

Men's singles

BWF International Challenge/Series (1 title, 1 runner-up) 
Men's singles

  BWF International Challenge tournament
  BWF International Series tournament

Performance timeline

National team 
 Junior level

 Senior level

Individual competitions 
 Junior level

 Senior level

Record against selected opponents 
Record against Year-end Finals finalists, World Championships semi-finalists, and Olympic quarter-finalists. Accurate as of 28 October 2022.

Awards and recognition

Order 
  :
 Companion of the Ahli Cemerlang Semangat Jerai Kedah (ASK) (2022)

References

External links 
 
 

1998 births
Living people
People from Kedah
Malaysian sportspeople of Chinese descent
Malaysian people of Hokkien descent
Malaysian people of Chinese descent
Malaysian male badminton players
Badminton players at the 2020 Summer Olympics
Olympic badminton players of Malaysia
Badminton players at the 2018 Asian Games
Asian Games competitors for Malaysia
Competitors at the 2017 Southeast Asian Games
Competitors at the 2019 Southeast Asian Games
Southeast Asian Games gold medalists for Malaysia
Southeast Asian Games silver medalists for Malaysia
Southeast Asian Games medalists in badminton